The Guantanamo military commissions were established by President George W. Bush – through a military order – on November 13, 2001, to try certain non-citizen terrorism suspects at the Guantanamo Bay prison. To date, there have been a total of eight convictions in the military commissions, six through plea agreements with the defendants. Several of the eight convictions have been overturned in whole or in part on appeal, mostly by U.S. federal courts.

There are five cases currently ongoing in the commissions—and another two pending appeal—including United States v. Khalid Sheikh Mohammed, et al.—the prosecution of the detainees alleged to be most responsible for the September 11, 2001, attacks. None of those five cases has yet gone to trial.

History 
As explained by the Congressional Research Service, the United States first used military commissions to try enemy belligerents accused of war crimes during the occupation in Mexico in 1847, made use of them in the Civil War and in the Philippine Insurrection, and then again in the aftermath of World War II. For the next fifty years, the U.S. relied on its established federal court and military justice systems to prosecute alleged war crimes and terrorism offenses.

On November 13, 2001, President Bush issued a military order governing the "Detention, Treatment, and Trial of Certain Non-Citizens in the War Against Terrorism". The military order effectively established the novel military commissions at Guantanamo Bay, which began in 2004 with charges against four Guantanamo detainees.

In 2006, the Supreme Court struck down the military commissions (in Hamdan v. Rumsfeld), determining that the commissions violated both the Uniform Code of Military Justice and the 1949 Geneva Conventions. In response, and in order to permit the commissions to go forward, Congress passed the Military Commissions Act of 2006 (MCA). Congress significantly amended the MCA in 2009. In 2019, exercising authority granted to him under the MCA, the Secretary of Defense published an updated Manual for Military Commissions, which sets forth the current procedures that govern the commissions.

Costs
According to the United States Government Accountability Office (GAO), from fiscal years 2012 to 2018 the Department of Defense spent $679.6 million on the military commissions. Defense Department officials told GAO that the department plans to spend almost $1.0 billion more from fiscal year 2019 through at least fiscal year 2023.

Commission cases and status
Of the 779 men detained at Guantanamo at some point since the prison opened on January 11, 2002, thirty two total have been charged in the military commissions. Charges were dismissed in 12 of those cases, and stayed in another. The U.S. government has procured eight convictions total, six of which were achieved through plea agreements with the defendants. U.S. federal courts have overturned several of the eight convictions in whole or in part.

There are five cases are currently ongoing in the commissions—and another two pending appeal—including United States v. Khalid Sheikh Mohammed, et al.—the prosecution of the detainees alleged to be most responsible for the September 11, 2001, attacks. None of those five cases has yet gone to trial.

On July 9, 2021, Brig. Gen. Mark Martins – the chief prosecutor for the military commissions since March 2009 – announced his retirement. That same day, The New York Times reported that "General Martins submitted his retirement papers ... after repeatedly butting heads with Biden administration lawyers over positions his office had taken on the applicable international law and the Convention Against Torture at the Guantánamo court, according to senior government officials with knowledge of the disputes."

Active cases and pending appeals

Closed, inactive, and dismissed cases

Public access limitations 
The Department of Defense currently facilitates public access to the military commissions, and to information about military commission proceedings, in the following ways:

 communicating directly with victims and their family members about hearings;
 enabling selected members of the public to view proceedings in-person;
 providing five sites in the United States to view proceedings remotely via closed circuit television (CCTV);
 making information such as court documents available on the Office of Military Commissions' website.

In practice, there are significant limitations associated with most of these access methods. Through the Fiscal Year 2018 National Defense Authorization Act, Congress required the Government Accountability Office (GAO) to study the feasibility and advisability of expanding access to military commissions proceeding that are open to the public. GAO published its report in February, 2019. Its findings included:

In-person viewing requires travel to Guantanamo, is limited to a narrow set of stakeholders, and is otherwise significantly burdensome in a number of respects. 
Travel to Guantanamo is onerous, and logistics once there are difficult. The military commissions courtroom gallery limits attendance to 52 seats. Moreover, GAO notes that "while selected victims and family members and non-government stakeholders are able to view proceedings in-person [at Guantanamo] the vast majority of the general public cannot, due to DOD policy."

The five CCTV sites are all located on military bases on the East Coast, significantly limiting access for both victims and their family members and the general public. 
GAO noted that "victims and their family members are located throughout the world or are concentrated in areas of the United States that are a significant distance from one of these five locations." Moreover, some victims and family members reported that they or their relatives have been denied access to certain of the sites because, "according to DOD, they did not meet the department's definition of a victim or family member."

Many court documents are not timely posted on the Office of Military Commissions website. 
By regulation, the Defense Department is supposed to post court documents on the Office of Military Commissions website generally no later than 15 business days after they have been filed in court. However, GAO found that "DOD has generally not met this standard for the timely posting of documents, which substantially limits public access to information about proceedings." A sampling of over 11,000 filings from a six-month period in 2018 showed that, save for unofficial court transcripts from open hearing, filings were not posted until "almost four months to more than five months past DOD's timeliness standard."

An enormous amount of information involved in commission proceedings remains secret, especially information related to post-9/11 U.S. torture. 
Defense Department officials told GAO that "unlike most—if not all—federal criminal trials or courts-martial, commissions' court documents and proceedings regularly involve an unprecedented amount of classified information that cannot be shared with the public. For example, DOD officials told us that a substantial amount of evidence used in the commissions' proceedings relates to partially-classified activities conducted by intelligence agencies outside the department—such as the Central Intelligence Agency's former Rendition, Detention, and Interrogation Program."

Consistent with GAO's findings, on August 4, 2021, 75 Members of Congress wrote to President Biden urging greater transparency in the military commissions process.

Comparisons to U.S. and international systems

United States justice systems
The United States has two parallel justice systems, with laws, statutes, precedents, rules of evidence, and paths for appeal.  Under these justice systems, prisoners have certain rights. They have a right to know the evidence against them; they have a right to protect themselves against self-incrimination; they have a right to counsel; and they have a right to have the witnesses against them cross-examined.

The two parallel justice systems are the Judicial Branch of the U.S. Government, and a slightly streamlined justice system named the Uniform Code of Military Justice (UCMJ) for people under military jurisdiction. People undergoing a military court martial are entitled to the same basic rights as those in the civilian justice system.

The Guantanamo military trials under the 2006 MCA do not operate according to either system of justice. The differences include:

 Unlike civilian courts, only two-thirds of the jury needs to agree in order to convict someone under the military commission rules. This includes charges such as supporting terrorism, attempted murder, and murder.
 The accused are not allowed access to all the evidence against them. The Presiding Officers are authorized to consider secret evidence which the accused have no opportunity to see or refute.
 It may be possible for the commission to consider evidence that was extracted through coercive interrogation techniques before passage of the Detainee Treatment Act. But, legally, the commission is restricted from considering any evidence extracted by torture, as defined by the Department of Defense in 2006.
 The proceedings may be closed at the discretion of the Presiding Officer, so that secret information may be discussed by the commission.
 The accused are not permitted a free choice of attorneys, as they can use only military lawyers or those civilian attorneys eligible for the Secret security clearance.
 Because the accused are charged as unlawful combatants (a certain category of people who are not classified as prisoners of war under the Geneva Conventions), then Secretary of Defense Donald Rumsfeld said in March 2002 that an acquittal on all charges by the commission is no guarantee of a release.

International
International human rights law prohibits trying non-military personnel in military tribunals. The United States has also never ratified the International Criminal Court statute, and withdrew its original signature of accession when it feared repercussions of the Iraq War.

Much like the military commissions, the International Criminal Court (ICC) trial procedures call for:

 A majority of the three judges present, as triers of fact, may reach a decision, which must include a full and reasoned statement. However, and unlike the U.S. Military Commission, those are judges and not mere military officers. Additionally, the ICC statute requires the judges to be of a high level of competence in criminal law and the necessary relevant experience; or have established competence in relevant areas of international law such as international humanitarian law and the law of human rights and extensive experience in a professional legal capacity which is of relevance to the judicial work of the Court.
 Trials are supposed to be public, but proceedings are often closed, and such exceptions to a public trial have not been enumerated in detail. Nonetheless, the ICC statute explicitly states that the principle is a public trial, and exceptions could be entertained by the judges if they provide sufficient grounding.
 In camera proceedings are allowed for protection of witnesses or defendants as well as for confidential or sensitive evidence. However, the statute states that this is an exception to the principle of public hearings which the court applies in particular to victims of sexual violence and children who are victims or witnesses.
 Hearsay and other indirect evidence is not explicitly prohibited in the statute, which adds flexibility to the proceedings due to the different legal traditions of the judges or of the applied law. But it has been argued the court is guided by hearsay exceptions which are prominent in common law systems, similar to the military commissions. Nonetheless, established rules of international law provides that admissibility of such evidence by guided by "hearsay exceptions generally recognized by some national legal systems, as well as the truthfulness, voluntariness and trustworthiness of the evidence."

Criticisms 
Many observers and stakeholders have expressed the view that the military commissions have failed. These observers and stakeholders include former senior U.S. government officials and military officers; families of victims of the 9/11 attacks; former military commission prosecutors; federal prosecutors; prosecutors from the Nuremberg trials following World War II; academics; Members of Congress; human rights organizations; and others. There has been outrage directed at the United States' usage of military commissions to try Guantanamo Bay detainees by the international community. Criticisms include that the militaries control of the trials has led to unfair results and procedures. The military tribunals secrecy, lack of habeas corpus, and overarching military control has led to criticisms against the US's usage of them.

In an amicus brief filed with the U.S. Supreme Court on August 20, 2021, September 11th Families for Peaceful Tomorrows – an organization of more than 250 family members of those killed in the attacks of September 11, 2001 – wrote the following:

"Through their collective experience, the pursuit of justice has appeared increasingly quixotic to the members of Peaceful Tomorrows, and they have lost confidence in the fairness and integrity of the Proceedings. As the twentieth anniversary of the September 11th attacks approaches, the members of Peaceful Tomorrows fear that the 9/11 Proceedings will never offer the justice they seek – namely, a fair trial that applies the rule of law to both sides and brings the defendants to justice. They also fear that the subjugation of the defendants' rights will result in a broader erosion of rights and undermine the historical legitimacy of the 9/11 Proceedings themselves."

See also

List of resignations from the Guantanamo military commission
Boycott of Guantanamo Military Commissions
Combatant Status Review Tribunal
Administrative Review Board
United States v. Khalid Sheikh Mohammed

References

Further reading

External links
 Military Commissions official website

 Amnesty International
John D. Altenburg, Defense Department Briefing on Military Commission Hearings, Department of Defense, August 17, 2004
 Military Tribunals: Historical Patterns and Lessons, CRS Report for Congress July 9, 2004
James Meek, US fires Guantánamo defence team, The Guardian, December 3, 2003
American Bar Association Task Force on Terrorism and the Law Report and Recommendations on Military Commissions: January 4, 2002(PDF)
At Gitmo, still no day in court: How feds avoid hearings for terror suspects — despite Supreme Court ruling, Newsday, June 15, 2005
Leaked emails claim Guantánamo trials rigged Australian Broadcasting Corporation August 1, 2005*Leaked emails claim Guantánamo trials rigged Australian Broadcasting Corporation August 1, 2005
UK resident released from Guantanamo, Breaking Legal news, April 1, 2007
 Rules Are Strict for Journalists Covering Gitmo
 Human Rights First; Undue Process: An Examination of Detention and Trials of Bagram Detainees in Afghanistan in April 2009 (2009)
 Human Rights First; Arbitrary Justice: Trial of Guantánamo and Bagram Detainees in Afghanistan (2008)
 Human Rights First: In Pursuit of Justice; Prosecuting Terrorism Cases in the Federal Courts (2009)
 
 
 
 Mix and Match at the Guantanamo Military Commissions

Military courts
Military Commission
Counterterrorism in the United States
Guantanamo Bay captives legal and administrative procedures
Military Commission
2001 establishments in the United States
Courts and tribunals established in 2001